Bikaner - Puri Express is an Express train of the Indian Railways connecting Bikaner Junction in Rajasthan and  Puri in Odisha. It is currently being operated with 14709/14710 train numbers on a weekly basis.

Service

The 14709/Bikaner - Puri Express has an average speed of 51 km/hr and covers 2093 km in 40 hrs 40 mins. 14710/Puri - Bikaner Express has an average speed of 52 km/hr and covers  2093 km in 40 hrs 30 mins.

Route and halts 

The important halts of the train are :

Traction

As the route is yet to be fully electrified, it is hauled by a Bhagat Ki Kothi Diesel Loco Shed based WDP-4 locomotive from Bikaner up to Sawai Madhopur handing over to an Itarsi Electric Loco Shed based WAM-4. From Jharsuguda it is hauled by a Bondamunda Diesel Loco Shed based twin WDM-3A locomotive for the remainder of the journey until Puri.

Coach composite

The train consists of 21 coaches :

 1 AC II Tier
 4 AC III Tier
 7 Sleeper Coaches
 6 General
 2 Second-class Luggage/parcel van

Direction Reversal

Train Reverses its direction 4 times:

See also 

 Bilaspur - Bikaner Express

References 
 14709/Bikaner - Puri Express
 14710/Puri - Bikaner Express

Transport in Bikaner
Transport in Puri
Railway services introduced in 2013
Rail transport in Rajasthan
Rail transport in Madhya Pradesh
Rail transport in Chhattisgarh
Rail transport in Odisha
Express trains in India
2013 establishments in India